KYKM (94.3 FM; "Texas Thunder Radio") is a radio station airing a country music format licensed to Yoakum, Texas, and simulcasted on sister station 99.9 KTXM in Hallettsville. The station is owned by Kremling Enterprises, Inc. of Shiner, Texas.

References

External links

Country radio stations in the United States
YKM